SM U-115 was a German Type U 115 U-boat (Projekt 43) of the Imperial German Navy built at Schichau-Werke, Elbing. As her sister ship , she was never completed and ultimately broken up in Danzig after the armistice.  Her main engines were used in M/S Adolf Sommerfeld ex . Both boats had been offered to the IGN free of charge by Schichau in an attempt to gain experience in building submarines. When construction of the two boats began to lag behind due to shortages in raw materials and lack of experience in submarine construction they were declared "war boats" (Kriegsboote), formally ordered by the Reichsmarineamt and given their respective designation. On 20 October 1918 Schichau-Werke reported U 115 would not be ready for delivery until the spring of 1919. Nevertheless 14 more boats of the class were ordered on 29 June 1918 for delivery in 1919.

References 

Notes

 Citations

Bibliography

R.H. Gibson, Maurice Prendergast, The German Submarine War 1914–1918, Periscope Publishing Ltd., 2002, p. 114
Eberhard Rössler, The U-boat: the evolution and technical history of German submarines, Naval Institute Press, 1981, p. 56
Eberhard Rössler, "Die deutschen U-Boote und ihre Werften, Vol. I.
Stefan Lipsky, Florian Lipsky, Deutsche U-Boote: hundert Jahre Technik und Entwicklung'', Mittler, 2006, p. 85

World War I submarines of Germany
Ships built in Elbing
Type U 115 submarines
Ships built by Schichau
1918 ships